Robert Rheinberger (born 18 November 1945) is an Australian former professional tennis player.

Rheinberger comes from a tennis playing family in the New South Wales town of Bega and competed on the professional tour in the 1970s. During his career he featured in the main draw of the French Open on multiple occasions. He was based out of Spain and later coached in West Germany.

References

External links
 
 

1945 births
Living people
Australian male tennis players
Tennis people from New South Wales
20th-century Australian people